The Reso Train, officially the State Resources Train, was a train operated by the Victorian Railways to bring business leaders from Melbourne and regional Victoria together. The concept was promoted by Harold Clapp, Chairman of Commissioners of the Victorian Railways with the city leaders travelling on the train to various parts of the state. It was complemented by the Better Farming Train from 1924. The first train ran to Swan Hill and Mildura in August 1922.

A typical consist in 1934 when the train was making its 22nd journey, accommodated 60 passengers with the train made up of a parlor car, three sleeping carriages, a dining car, an office car, a staff car and a van. It ceased with the outbreak of World War II, before resuming in May 1947.

The train was described in the August 1954 Victorian Railways News Letter as having four or five sleeping cars, plus an unidentified 42-seater dining car, the original Norman, the first Carey, Goulburn and possibly a brake van.

A typical itinerary is demonstrated by the trains 53rd journey in March 1959 where it left Melbourne on a five-day journey with the passengers visiting the Hume Weir, Rutherglen Research Station, Mount Buffalo National Park, Kiewa Hydroelectric Scheme and the rayon and wool industries of Wangaratta.

References

Railway services introduced in 1922
Rail transport in Victoria (Australia)
1922 establishments in Australia